Eliška Konopiská (born 5 January 1948) is a Czech printmaker, graphic artist, typographer, and illustrator.

A native of Prague, Konopiská graduated from that city's Academy of Arts, Architecture and Design, where she studied with František Muzika. Active in a variety of genres, she has designed and illustrated many books, and has also worked as a typographer for a variety of publishing houses. Her work has been exhibited both in the Czech Republic and abroad, and she has won a variety of awards during her career. Her 1983 print Hra (Play), a color aquatint and etching, is owned by the National Gallery of Art.

References

1948 births
Living people
Czech printmakers
Czech typographers and type designers
Czech illustrators
Czech women illustrators
Women printmakers
20th-century Czech artists
20th-century printmakers
20th-century Czech women artists
21st-century Czech artists
21st-century printmakers
21st-century Czech women artists
Artists from Prague
Academy of Arts, Architecture and Design in Prague alumni